Black Magic is a 1929 American silent drama film directed by George B. Seitz. As of 2020, no prints of the film survive in archives.

Cast
 Josephine Dunn as Katherine Bradbroke
 Earle Foxe as Hugh Darrell
 John Holland as John Ormsby
 Henry B. Walthall as Dr. Bradbroke
 Dorothy Jordan as Ann Bradbroke
 Fritz Feld as James Fraser
 Sheldon Lewis as Witchdoctor
 Ivan Linow as Zelig
 Blue Washington as Unit

References

External links

1929 films
1929 drama films
American silent feature films
American black-and-white films
Silent American drama films
Films directed by George B. Seitz
Fox Film films
1920s American films